Paul Addison  (3 May 1943 – 21 January 2020) was a British historian known for his research on the political history of Britain during the Second World War and the post-war period. Addison was part of the first generation of academic historians to study the conflict and is most notable for The Road to 1945 (1975) which traced the origins of the post-war consensus into the wartime period.

Early life
Paul Addison was born in Whittington, near Lichfield, in Staffordshire on 3 May 1943. His father was a Native American soldier in the United States Army who was posted in the country as part of the preparations for the "Second Front" during the Second World War. He had no contact with Addison after his birth. He was instead brought up by his mother, Pauline Wilson Walker, who served as a Land Girl during the conflict.

Addison studied at the University of Oxford. He completed his undergraduate degree at Pembroke College before moving to Nuffield College as a postgraduate. Along with his contemporary Angus Calder (1942–2008), he was among the first of a new generation of academic historians to examine the history of the Second World War critically without having personally experienced it. His doctoral studies addressed political opposition to the Churchill war ministry and was supervised by A.J.P. Taylor. Addison gained a D.Phil in 1971.

The Road to 1945
Addison's first book was The Road to 1945 which was published with Jonathan Cape in 1975. It has been described as "a landmark in the writing of contemporary history" in Britain. It followed the publication of Calder's influential The People's War (1969) but focused more narrowly on the causes of the landslide victory of the Labour Party in the 1945 general election.  He wrote:

Addison's argument was that the "post-war consensus" reflected an ideological convergence which had occurred during the Second World War itself. He consisted that both Conservative and Labour parties had broadly converged on the need for a managed economy, limited nationalisation, and a welfare state in this period. The Road to 1945 was influential in framing the arguments in the political history of the Second World War in the United Kingdom.

Later work
Addison lectured at Pembroke College before moving to the University of Edinburgh in 1967. He remained at the university for most of his career. He published several further works on British politics during the wartime and post-war periods. These included two noted biographies of Winston Churchill, namely Churchill on the Home Front (1992) and Churchill: The Unexpected Hero (2005).

From 1996, he was director of the Centre for Second World War Studies. He retired in 2005 and became a fellow of the Royal Society of Edinburgh in 2006. His students included the future prime minister Gordon Brown. It has been argued that Addison's influence led to Brown's decision to raise the top rate of income tax during his premiership.

Selected publications
 The Road to 1945, Jonathan Cape, 1975, 
 Now the War is Over: A Social History of Britain, 1945-1951, Jonathan Cape, 1985, 
 Churchill on the Home Front, Jonathan Cape, 1992, 
 Time to Kill: The Soldier's Experience of War in the West 1939-1945, Paul Addison, Angus Calder ed., Pimlico, 1997,  
 The Burning Blue: A New History of the Battle of Britain, Paul Addison, Jeremy Crang ed., Pimlico, 2000, 
 Churchill: The Unexpected Hero, Oxford University Press, 2005, 
 Firestorm: The Bombing of Dresden, 1945, Pimlico, Paul Addison, Jeremy Crang ed., Pimlico, 2006, 
 A Companion to Contemporary Britain, 1939-2000, Paul Addison, Harriet Jones ed., Wiley-Blackwell, 2007, 
 Winston Churchill, Oxford University Press, 2007, 
 No Turning Back: The Peacetime Revolutions of Post-War Britain, Oxford University Press, 2010,

References

Further reading
 
 
 

1943 births
2020 deaths
20th-century British male writers
20th-century British writers
21st-century British male writers
British historians
British people of Native American descent
Academics of the University of Edinburgh
Alumni of Nuffield College, Oxford
Fellows of the Royal Society of Edinburgh
Historians of World War II
Historians of the British Isles
Alumni of Pembroke College, Oxford
People associated with the University of Oxford
People from Whittington, Staffordshire
English people of Native American descent